Wigham may refer to:

Gary Wigham (born 1961), former English cricketer
John Richardson Wigham (1829–1906), prominent lighthouse engineer of the 19th century
John Wigham Richardson (1837–1908), shipbuilder on Tyneside during the late 19th and early 20th century
Margaret Wigham (1904-1972) American composer, music educator and pianist
Philip Wigham Richardson (1865–1953), British sport shooter and Conservative politician
Wigham Richardson shipbuilding company founded by John Wigham Richardson

See also
WIGM
Wickham (disambiguation)
Wigan
Wigwam